This article features the 1990 UEFA European Under-18 Championship qualifying stage. Matches were played 1988 through 1990. Eight group winners qualified for the main tournament in Hungary.

Group 1

Group 2

Group 3

Group 4

Group 5

Group 6

Group 7

Group 8

See also
 1990 UEFA European Under-18 Championship

External links
Results by RSSSF

UEFA European Under-19 Championship qualification
Qual
Qual